John Chester Miller (1907-1991) was a US historian who wrote of the American Revolution and its prominent figures. His books were well received.

Born in Santa Barbara, California, he studied at College of Puget Sound for a year before transferring to Harvard University, where he earned a bachelor's degree in 1930. Encouraged by Samuel Eliot Morison to change his postgraduate focus to history, he received master's and doctoral degrees in that field during the 1930s.

He taught at Bryn Mawr College and at Stanford University.

Bibliography

 Sam Adams, Pioneer in Propaganda. Stanford University Press, 1936. .
 Crisis in Freedom: The Alien and Sedition Acts. Little, Brown, 1951. .
 Alexander Hamilton: Portrait in Paradox. Harper, 1959.
 Origins of the American Revolution: With a New Introd, and a Bibliography. Stanford University Press, 1959. .
 The Federalist Era 1789-1801. Harper and Brothers, 1960. .
 The Wolf by the Ears: Thomas Jefferson and Slavery. Published with the Thomas Jefferson Memorial Foundation, University Press of Virginia, 1991. .

Reviews

 The Wolf by the Ears. Indiana Museum of History. .
 Crisis in Freedom: The Alien and Sedition Acts. The Pennsylvania Magazine of History and Biography. 
 The Federalist Era. The American Historical Review.

References

1907 births
1991 deaths
Harvard University alumni
20th-century American historians
American male non-fiction writers
Bryn Mawr College faculty
Stanford University faculty
University of Puget Sound alumni
20th-century American male writers